Navajos is a small Spanish river, in Castile and León. It is a tributary of Valderaduey.

Rivers of Spain
Rivers of Castile and León